Highlandtown Lake is a man-made lake located in Washington Township, Columbiana County, Ohio. It was created in 1966 when the State of Ohio built a dam impounding  of water on the upper drainage of the Little Yellow Creek. A lot of habitat improvement was done on what would be the bottom of the lake prior to the impoundment.

The dam is of earthen construction, rock fill. Maximum discharge is 4196 cubic feet per second.

Location 
It is in the Wildlife District Three of the Ohio Division of Wildlife. It is part of the  Highlandtown Wildlife Area. 
It is within a mile of an area known as Highlandtown. It is four miles northeast of Salineville via State Route 39 and nine miles south of Lisbon via State Route 164. It is 11 miles northwest of Wellsville via State Route 39. A portion of the Steubenville Pike Road (Township Road 776) was covered by the lake and it now dead ends at the lake. Osborne Road crosses the northwest arm of the lake. Charles Mill Road (County Highway 413) crosses the northern arm of the lake.

Geography
The area is an Appalachian mixed mesophytic forest. The lake is at the headwaters of Little Yellow Creek.

Fish 
The lake was stocked in 1967 with muskellunge, largemouth bass, bluegill, and channel catfish. At present there are also black crappie, brown bullheads, pumpkinseeds and other varieties of sunfish. In about 2000 American gizzard shad appeared in the lake. Because of feeding patterns this resulted in bass getting bigger and bluegills getting smaller. White amurs (grass carp) have been introduced to control weeds and they have remove weed beds which were good places to fish for bass.

For a lake map and more information on the fishing conditions contact the Highlandtown Wildlife Area at (330) 644-2293.

Facilities
There is parking, boat ramps, and a handicap dock for fishing. There is no camping in the wildlife area.

References 

Cross, Tom. Fishing Ohio: An Angler's Guide to Over 200 Fishing Spots in the Buckeye State. Lyons Press, 2008, p. 147-149.
Highlandtown Lake at Ohio Department of Natural Resources

External links 

 

Reservoirs in Ohio
Dams completed in 1966
Fishing in the United States
Boating
Bodies of water of Columbiana County, Ohio